Tang-e Narak Rural District is a rural district (dehestan) in the Central District of Khonj County, Fars Province, Iran. At the 2006 census, its population was 3,341, in 568 families.  The rural district has 9 villages.

References 

Rural Districts of Fars Province
Khonj County